Josiah Alvin Mapes (April 23, 1861 – January 11, 1942) was an American politician in the state of Washington. He served in the Washington House of Representatives.

References

Republican Party members of the Washington House of Representatives
1861 births
1942 deaths